Caroline "K.K." Harvey (born October 14, 2002) is an American ice hockey defenceman for Wisconsin and member of the United States women's national ice hockey team. She represented the United States at the 2022 Winter Olympics.

Playing career
Harvey was originally committed to play college ice hockey for the Wisconsin during the 2021–22 NCAA season but deferred to the 2022–23 NCAA season after being selected to represent team USA at the 2022 Winter Olympics. During the 2022–23 season, in her rookie year, she recorded 12 goals and 26 assists in 39 games. She led all all WCHA rookies with 38 points. Her 38 points were the fifth most in program history by a defender and only trailed Sis Paulsen for most points as a rookie defender. Following an outstanding season, she was named to the WCHA All-Rookie team and Second Team All-WCHA and was named the WCHA Rookie of the Year. She was also named CCM/AHCA Second-Team All-American. She became first Badger player to earn All-America honors as a freshman since Meghan Hunter during the 2000–01 season. During the NCAA semifinals Harvey scored the game-winning goal in overtime against Minnesota to send Wisconsin to the championship game.

International play
Harvey represented the United States at the 2019 IIHF World Women's U18 Championship where she won a silver medal. She again represented the United States at the 2020 IIHF World Women's U18 Championship where she was a team-high +4 plus–minus in five games and won a gold medal.

She was the youngest player named to the roster for the United States at the 2021 IIHF Women's World Championship, where she recorded one goal and two assists in six games and won a silver medal. She again represented the United States at the 2022 IIHF Women's World Championship, where she recorded three goals and five assists in seven games and won a silver medal.

In January 2022, Harvey was named to Team USA's roster for the 2022 Winter Olympics, where she was the youngest player on the roster. During the tournament she was scoreless in seven games and won a silver medal.

Career statistics

Regular season and playoffs

International

Awards and honors

References

External links

2002 births
Living people
American women's ice hockey defensemen
Ice hockey people from New Hampshire
People from Pelham, New Hampshire
21st-century American women
Wisconsin Badgers women's ice hockey players
Ice hockey players at the 2022 Winter Olympics
Olympic ice hockey players of the United States
Medalists at the 2022 Winter Olympics
Olympic silver medalists for the United States in ice hockey